New Mexico State Road 45 (NM 45) is a  State Highway in the US state of New Mexico that runs parallel to the Rio Grande from the Pueblo of Isleta, through Albuquerque, and to the Southern boundary of Rio Rancho.

Route description

Throughout most of Albuquerque, NM 45 is called Coors Boulevard. Coors Boulevard serves as a major expressway in Albuquerque as it allows access to Interstate 40 (I-40), and other major highways in the city such as NM 423 (Paseo Del Norte), NM 528 (Alameda Boulevard), and NM 500 (Rio Bravo Boulevard/Sen. Dennis Chaves Boulevard). NM 45 merges with NM 528 near Rio Rancho, New Mexico at Pat D'Arco Highway. Coors Bypass NW is a segment of NM 45 which runs north from Coors Road to Pat D'Arco Highway.

History

Until 2012, the northernmost portion of this route traversed Old Coors Road between Coors Boulevard and Central Avenue (Historic U.S. Route 66).  NM 45 has since been realigned to Coors Boulevard and Coors By-Pass and extended north of Central Avenue, replacing the portion of NM 448 between St. Joseph's Drive and Coors By-Pass, and turning over Old Coors Road to local control to be realigned with Yucca Drive.

Major intersections

See also

 List of state roads in New Mexico

References

External links

0045
Transportation in Bernalillo County, New Mexico
Transportation in Albuquerque, New Mexico